The 125th Battalion (1st Overseas Battalion of 38th Regiment Dufferin Rifles),  CEF was a unit in the Canadian Expeditionary Force during the First World War.

History 
Based in Brantford, Ontario, the unit began recruiting in late 1915 throughout Brant County.  After sailing to England in August 1916, the battalion was absorbed into the 8th Reserve Battalion on April 16, 1918.

The 125th Battalion, CEF had one Officer Commanding: Lieut-Col. M. E. B. Cutcliffe.

Perpetuations 
In 1920, the perpetuation of the 125th Battalion, CEF was first assigned to The Dufferin Rifles of Canada, and is now held by the 56th Field Artillery Regiment, RCA.

 The Dufferin Rifles of Canada (1920-1936)
 The Dufferin and Haldimand Rifles of Canada (1936-1946)
 56th Field Artillery Regiment, RCA (1946–Present)

References

Meek, John F. Over the Top! The Canadian Infantry in the First World War. Orangeville, Ont.: The Author, 1971.

Battalions of the Canadian Expeditionary Force
Military units and formations established in 1915
Military units and formations disestablished in 1918
1915 establishments in Ontario